Cody Crowley (born 25 March 1993) is a Canadian professional boxer.

Professional boxing career
Crowley made his professional debut against Ronnie Peterson on 28 June 2014. He won the fight by a second-round technical knockout. He amassed an 11–0 record during the next three years, before being booked to face Edgar Ortega for the vacant Canadian Professional Boxing Council's International super-welterweight title on 13 May 2017. He won his first professional title by a dominant unanimous decision, with all three judges awarding him all ten rounds of the bout. Crowley made his first title defense against Richard Holmes on 30 September 2017. He won the fight by a sixth-round technical knockout.

Crowley was booked to face Kevin Higson for the vacant Canada Professional Boxing Council National super welterweight title on 5 May 2018. He won the fight by a dominant unanimous decision, with all three judges scoring the fight 100–90 in his favor. Crowely next faced Michi Munoz in a non-title bout on 14 July 2018. He won the fight by a second-round knockout. Crowley faced Juan Angulo Gonzalez in yet another non-title bout on 16 November 2018. He won the fight by a sixth-round technical knockout.

Crowley made his first CPBC National super welterweight title defense against Stuart McLellan on 9 February 2019. He won the fight by unanimous decision, with all three judges scoring the fight 120–107 in his favor. Crowley made his second national title defense against Mian Hussain on 19 October 2019. He won the fight by unanimous decision, with all three judges scoring the fight 100–90 for him.

Crowely's sole fight of 2020 came against Josh Torres on 6 September 2020, at the Microsoft Theater in Los Angeles, on the undercard of the Yordenis Ugas and Abel Ramos WBA World welterweight title bout. It was his first fight in United States since 14 May 2016. Crowely won the fight by a unanimous decision, with all three judges awarding him a 100–90 scorecard.

Crowley was expected to face the #1 ranked IBF welterweight contender Kudratillo Abdukakhorov on 10 April 2021, as a replacement for Javier Flores, who was forced to withdraw from the bout after a positive COVID-19 test. The fight would fail to pan out however, as the two camps were unable to come to terms. Crowley was instead booked to face Gabriel Maestre for the vacant WBA interim welterweight title on 7 August 2021. Crowley withdrew from the fight on 29 July, after testing positive for COVID-19.

Crowley was booked to face the Kudratillo Abdukakhorov on 11 December 2021, at the Dignity Health Sports Park in Carson, California, on the undercard of the Nonito Donaire and Reymart Gaballo WBC world bantamweight title bout. Despite getting knocked down in the second round, Crowley managed to rally back in the following rounds and win the fight by unanimous decision, with scores of 97–92, 95–94 and 98–91.

Crowely was booked to face the one-time WBA welterweight and WBC light middleweight title challenger Josesito López on April 16, 2022, on the Errol Spence Jr. vs. Yordenis Ugás welterweight title unification pay per view. He won the fight by unanimous decision, with two scorecards of 98–91 and one scorecard of 99–90. Crowley scored the sole knockdown of the fight in the seventh round, although Lopez immediately claimed it as a slip.

Crowley is scheduled to face the one-time WBA welterweight title challenger Abel Ramos on March 25, 2023.

Professional boxing record

References

Living people
1993 births
Canadian male boxers
Sportspeople from Peterborough
Boxing people from Ontario
Welterweight boxers
Light-middleweight boxers